The 2012–13 Biathlon World Cup – World Cup 6 was held in Antholz, Italy, from 17 January until 20 January 2013.

Schedule of events

Medal winners

Men

Women

References 

- World Cup 6
Biathlon World Cup - World Cup 6
Biathlon World Cup - World Cup 6
Biathlon competitions in Italy